This is a list of films produced in Albania during the 2000s.

Films
 Parrullat  (2001)
 Tirana Viti Zero  (2001)
 Zefi  (2001)
 Edeni i braktisur  (2002)
 Lule të kuqe, lule të zeza  (2003)
 Nata pa hënë  (2003)
 Një ditë e mrekullueshme  (2003)
 Yllka  (2003)
 I dashur armik  (2004)
 Vals  (2004)
 Luleborë  (2005)
 Gjoleka, djali i Abazit  (2006)
 Syri magjik  (2006)
 Busulla  (2007)
 Mao Ce Dun  (2007)
 Koha e Kometës  (2008)
 Ne dhe Lenini  (2008)
 Sekretet  (2008)
 Shënjtorja  (2008)
 Të gjithë qajnë  (2008)
 Trishtimi i Zonjës Shnajder  (2008)
 Gjallë!  (2009)
 Kronikë provinciale  (2009)
 Lindje Perëndim Lindje  (2009)
 Muaj Mjalti  (2009)

References

Lists of Albanian films